9x Jalwa is an Indian classic Hindi music television channel, broadcast in India. The channel is owned by 9X Media.
9x Jalwa is India's Classic Channel, and Plays 1990s to 2010s
Music in India. It was launched in 2012.

9x Jalwa is part of 9X Media – India's classic music television network based in India. 9x Jalwa will be an encrypted but free to air channel. It airs Hindi Classic Music across India. 9x Jalwa has also a website named Spotboye.com.

List of programs
 Melody Forever
 Love forever
 AskMona
 Jalwa Superstars
 Jalwa Superstars Classics
 Star Tracks
 Hits forever

References

External links
  
 

Music television channels in India
Television stations in Mumbai
9X Media